= Indonesian-Ukrainian dictionary =

Indonesian-Ukrainian dictionary (cover)

Indonesian-Ukrainian dictionary by Mykhailo Izhyk is the first lexicographical work of Indonesian language in Ukrainian linguistics. It was released in 2013 by the publishing house "Chetverta Hvylia" with the financial support of the Embassy of the Republic Indonesia in Ukraine.

The author started working on the dictionary in summer 2009 after completing his language training in Jakarta provided by the government educational program "Darmasiswa" of the Republic of Indonesia.

The dictionary contains 16000 words that are actively used in Indonesian language. In addition to the general vocabulary it has many words from different disciplines - economics, law, medicine etc. Over 1500 acronyms and abbreviations used in modern Indonesian language are put into a separate section of the dictionary.

Pages: 336

Copies: 500 ( Most of the copies were submitted to the Embassy of the Republic Indonesia in Ukraine and Taras Shevchenko National University of Kyiv).

The presentation of the dictionary was held on September 17, 2013 at President Hotel in Kyiv, Ukraine.

ISBN 978-966-529-286-9

== Sources ==
Resepsi Diplomatik dalam rangka memperingati HUT RI ke-68 KBRI Kyiv dan Peluncuran Kamus Bahasa Indonesia-Ukraina (id.)

== See also ==
- Indonesian language
- Ukrainian language
